Kermia thorssoni is a species of sea snail, a marine gastropod mollusk in the family Raphitomidae.

Description
The length of the shell varies between 4 mm and 8 mm.

Distribution
This mùarine species occurs off Taiwan and the Philippines.

References

External links
 Gastropods.com: Kermia thorssoni
 

thorssoni
Gastropods described in 2001